Miguel Ángel Reyes Vergara (born 26 May 1992) is a Colombian cyclist, who currently rides for UCI Continental team .

Major results
2017
 5th Overall Vuelta a Colombia
1st  Mountains classification
1st Stage 9
2018
 2nd Overall Vuelta a Cundinamarca
2019
 1st  Overall Vuelta a Antioquia
1st Stages 3 & 4
 1st Overall Vuelta al Valle del Cauca
 1st Stage 3 (ITT) Clásica de Anapoima 
 2nd Overall Clásica de Fusagasugá
1st Stage 1 (ITT)

References

External links

1992 births
Living people
Colombian male cyclists
Sportspeople from Bogotá
Vuelta a Colombia stage winners